Bōkun Habanero is the brand name of a Japanese snack food. The name means "Tyrant Habanero", a reference to the habanero pepper, which is one of the world's hottest chili peppers.  Its name derives from a play on words linking "habanero" with "Tyrant Nero".

The snack consists of potato rings, and is moderately spicy by Japanese standards.

The package features the brand mascot, Tyrant Habanero, a chili pepper with an evil or maniacal grin. The bebiita version features his younger sister, and the bebinero version features a younger version of the regular character.

Each 55g packet contains 297.3 calories.

Cultural references

Bōkun Habanero is the focus of a popular Japanese internet meme that started on the popular Japanese internet Bulletin board system Futaba Channel.  The meme revolves around an anthropomorphic caricature based on Bōkun Habanero and its mascot.  The caricature, Habanero-tan, is a young, naive girl in a red dress who resembles the personification of an habanero pepper.

External links
Tohato official page features an animated version of Bokun's quest for revenge.
Boukun.jp alternative official site features more information such as recipes.
Hot Spicy Snack Wars Story about Boukun Habanero and KaraMucho

Japanese snack food
Snack food manufacturers of Japan